Angelique Beatrice Dionela (born January 26, 1991) is a Filipino volleyball athlete. Dionela played for the University of Perpetual Help System Dalta collegiate women's University team. She is currently plays for the Cignal HD Spikers in the Premier Volleyball League.

Career

NCAA
Dionela was a member of Perpetual Help Lady Altas collegiate women's volleyball team. She is the libero of the team and they won 3 peat championships in the NCAA from NCAA Season 85 to 87.

Shakey's V-League/PVL

In 2012, she won best Digger in the 2013 SVL Open Conference with her team Cagayan Valley Lady Rising Suns.

In 2013, her team Cagayan Valley Lady Rising Suns won in the 2013 SVL Open Conference. After that, she joined Cignal HD Spikers competing in the Philippine Super Liga.

In 2020, Philippine Super Liga cancelled the league because of the COVID-19 pandemic.

In 2021, her team Cignal HD Spikers transferred to Premier Volleyball League.

Clubs
  Cagayan Valley Lady Rising Suns - (2012)
  Cignal HD Spikers - (2013–present)

Awards

Individual

Collegiate

Clubs

References 

Filipino women's volleyball players
Living people
Liberos
University of Perpetual Help System DALTA alumni
1991 births